The Twelve Apostles are part of the Table Mountain complex overlooking Camps Bay. The mountain range stretches 6 km almost to Hout Bay. They actually consist of eighteen peaks. From North to South they are named Kloof, Fountain, Porcupine, Jubilee, Barrier, Valken, Kasteel, Postern, Wood, Spring, Slangolie, Corridor, Separation, Victoria, Grove, Llandudno Peak, Llandudno Corridor, and Hout Bay Corner. The average height above sea level is 750 m, compared to 1,060 m for Table Mountain. Under the Dutch East India Company, the range was known as the Castle Mountains or Gable Mountains.
.

Sources 
 Rosenthal, Eric, Ensiklopedie van Suidelike Afrika, 1967

References 

Geography of Cape Town